Viettel or Viettel Group, formally the Viettel Military Industry and Telecoms Group, is a Vietnamese multinational telecommunications company headquartered in Hanoi, Vietnam. Viettel is the largest mobile network operator in Vietnam. It is a state-owned enterprise and operated by the Ministry of National Defence, make it practically a military-associated corporation.

Viettel Telecom is currently the dominant network operator with the largest market share in Vietnamese telecommunications services market. For 30 years, Viettel has grown from a construction company to a complex of five business lines including telecommunications and information technology (IT); research and manufacture of electronic and telecommunications equipment; defense industry; cyber security and digital services. Viettel is considered one of the largest and most effective state-owned enterprises of Vietnam, thanks to its highest revenue, largest contribution to the State budget and highest brand value.
Since 2000, Viettel has earned VND 1.78 quadrillion of revenue whereas its profit, owner's equity and return on equity reached VND 334 trillion, VND 134 trillion and 30%-40%, respectively. Viettel has spent VND 3,500 billion in CSR activities. Besides its well known civillian telecommunications sector, Viettel is becoming a major defence contractor of Vietnam with the engagement of its noticeable subsidiaries Viettel High Tech and Viettel Aerospace Institute in developing, producing and supplying Vietnam People's Army with many indigenous products and armaments such as military communication devices, military drones, surveillance radars, and missiles.

, Viettel had 50,000 employees inside and outside the country, and served 110 million subscribers.

History

1989–1999: A construction company

Electronics and Communication Equipment Corporation (SIGELCO), the forerunner of Viettel Group (Viettel), was established on 1 June 1989.

In December 1992, SIGELCO applied for the State's permission for transforming into Electronics and Communication Equipment Company under the management of the Signal Corps.

On 13 June 1995, the Prime Minister issued Notification No. 3179/DM-DN on the permission for the establishment of Military Electronics and Telecommunications Company. On 14 July 1995, the Minister of National Defense decided to officially change the company's name to Military Electronics and Telecommunications Company, VIETEL in short. At that time, Vietel was the second firm to get business license for all telecommunications services in Vietnam.

On 1 July 1997, Vietel Post was established, first providing newspaper publishing services.

2000–2009: A boom in telecommunications services market

On 3 February 2000, Mr. Mai Liem Truc, General Director of the General Department of Post and Telecommunication signed a decision that allowed Vietel to pilot long-distance call services using VoIP technology. For the first time, Vietnam had an operator with licensed to supply VoIP. On 15 October 2000, Vietel officially piloted VoIP service for Hanoi - Ho Chi Minh City route with "178 - your saving code" campaign. Vietel was the only VoIP service provider in Vietnam then. The campaign hit the market with a phenomenal success, bringing huge revenue and prestige to Vietel. They continued to expand the service to 62 more provinces (Hanoi and Ha Tay was separate at that time) and broke even only 9 months later.

On 5 December 2001, Vietel launched the international call service using VoIP technology. One year later, they launched the Internet service, connecting internationally at the speed of 2 Mbit/s while costing only one third of the current price.

On 28 October 2003, the Ministry of National Defense (MOD) changed the company's name to Military Telecommunications Company, Viettel in short, under the management of the Signal Corps. In March 2003, Viettel offered long-distance public switched telephone network (PSTN) call service in Hanoi and Ho Chi Minh City.

On 9 January 2004, Viettel officially launched its current logo and brand identity.

On 27 April 2004, MOD moved Viettel from under the management of the Signal Corps to the MOD.

On 15 October 2004, Viettel launched 098 mobile service.

On 6 April 2005, the company changed its name to Military Telecommunications Corporation under the management of MOD and its subordinate Centers and Factories were transformed into Subsidiaries.

In 2006, Viettel established Viettel Cambodia supplying international call service, Internet and leased line services in Cambodia.

In 2007, Viettel introduced many key subsidiaries namely Viettel Telecom Corporation (by merging three large companies in Long-distance, Internet and Mobile), Viettel Technology Center and Viettel Global Investment Joint Stock.

In 2008, Viettel actively promoted their CSR activities such as sponsoring "We are soldiers" TV show, "Nhu chua he co cuoc chia ly" TV Show, "Trai tim cho em", "Operation Smile", and so on.

In 2009, Viettel Cambodia in Cambodia and Star Telecom (a partnership between Viettel and Lao Asia Telecom) in Laos went into operation under the brand names of Metfone and Unitel respectively.

On 14 December 2009, Military Telecommunications Corporation became Military Telecommunications Group under the management of the MOD. After more than 5 years of providing mobile services, Viettel Mobile held 40% of market share in terms of the quantity of mobile subscribers, which was equivalent to 42.5 million active subscribers.

2010–2018: A global technology group

On 25 March 2010, Viettel launched 3G services in 63 provinces and cities with 8,000 active 3G BTS throughout the country.

On 8 September 2011, Viettel launched Natcom telecommunications brand in Haiti after almost one year of preparation, claiming to be the mere company to offer full package of telecommunications services and 3G technology. Natcom was also the only telco that owned the unique international Internet port in Haiti via the 10 Gbit/s cable line to Bahamas and the United States.

At the end of 2011, Viettel's production line for telecommunications and information technology (IT) equipment was put into operation. The year of 2011 also marked exceptional milestones in Viettel's research and production such as the successful trial of disaster warning system, the launch of Viettel IDC's Song Than Data Center, and the establishment of Viettel Research and Development Institute.

On 5 December 2011, Viettel acquired original EVN Telecom.

On 15 May 2012, Viettel launched Movitel mobile network in Mozambique. At the beginning of October, the first batch of Sumo 2G V6206 mobile phones made by Viettel was officially introduced onto the market.

In 2013, at telecommunications and IT forums, the Group's leader declared Viettel's strategic transferral from a mobile network operator to a service provider. In March 2013, Telemor network was launched in Timor Leste. In June 2013, Viettel would supply the PAVN with Vietnamese-made UAVs before the end of the year. In July 2013, Viettel began production of military-grade radio equipment for the PAVN. A short-range UAV known as the VT-Patrol was made before the end of 2013.

In 2014, Nexttel in Cameroon and Bitel in Peru went into business. After 10 years of providing mobile services, Viettel started to focus on IT services, launching many digital services and solutions such as CA - digital signature service, SMAS - school management system, Agri.One - farmer supporting solution, BankPlus – door-to-door money transferring application and so on. On 25 February 2014, the company announced their success in manufacturing UAVs.

Also in the same year, instead of sponsoring for various small programs, Viettel focused on large and significant CSR programs such as "Quy bo giong thoat ngheo", "Vi em hieu hoc" and so on.

In March and October, 2015, Viettel launched Lumitel network in Burundi and Halotel in Tanzania. In Vietnam, Viettel is the first telco to pilot 4G services.

In November, 2016, Viettel was officially granted the license to supply 4G services in Vietnam, declaring that they was able to produce infrastructure equipment for telecommunications network. Spontaneously, the number of Viettel's international customers hit 35 million.

On 18 April 2017, Viettel launched 4G telecommunications network in Vietnam. Thanks to its nationwide coverage of up to 95%, Viettel became the first mobile network operator in the world to have nationwide 4G coverage right after launching. In the middle of 2017, Viettel's real time billing system (vOCS) was applied into practice.

In 2018, Viettel intensified their efforts to contribute to the development of e-Government with flagship products such as national immunization information management system, national population database, smart city, and national single window portal. On 19 July 2017, Viettel was officially recognized by the Government as a Defense and Security Enterprise.

On 5 January 2018, Military Telecommunications Group changed their name to Military Industry – Telecommunication Group. In March 2018, Viettel introduced their virtual server service entitled Viettel StartCloud, soaring to the leading position in the Data center and Cloud market. In June, 2018, the 10th international brand of Viettel was launched in Myanmar under the brand name of Mytel.

In August 2018, Viettel entered the 4th development stage: 4.0 and Global Business, aiming to maintaining the growth rate of 10-15%, becoming a global technology and business group, and continuing to lead the telecommunication and high-technology markets in Vietnam.

2018–present: Digital service provider

At the beginning of December 2018, Viettel successfully activated the NB-IoT based infrastructure with the first 30 BTS in Hanoi, claiming the title of first telco in Vietnam to successfully deploy commercial IoT network. In the first half of 2019, Viettel also launched many corporations and companies which are strategic in their 4th stage namely Viettel Business Solutions Corporation, Viettel Cyber Security, Viettel Hi-Tech Industries Corporation and Viettel Digital Services Corporation.

In April 2019, Viettel completed the integration of the first 5G infrastructure in Hoan Kiem Lake area (Hanoi) and triumphantly tested broadcasting 5G service on the frequency bands licensed by the Ministry of Information and Communications. On 10 May 2019, Viettel and Ericsson Group made the first official connection on 5G network in Vietnam.

In June 2019, Viettel++, Viettel's largest customer care program ever, became operational. At the end of the same month, e-Cabinet platform, an information system to serve the Cabinet's meetings and work processing, was launched after more than three months of preparation. At the launching ceremony, Mr. Le Dang Dung, Viettel's Acting President and Chief Executive Officer, committed their restless efforts in accompanying the Government to develop a digital society as well as e-Government system in Vietnam.

In July 2019, Viettel entered technological ride-hailing market with MyGo application and launched an e-commerce website at VoSo.vn. At the end of the month, Viettel declared their intention to turn Mocha into a super application for music, films, videos, news, games, etc. Mocha would also be connected with other applications within Viettel's ecosystem.

In August 2019, at Vietnam ICT Summit 2019, Viettel and large IT enterprises in Vietnam established the Vietnam Digital Transformation Alliance whose Chairman is Major General Le Dang Dung, Viettel's Acting President cum Chief Executive Officer.

In September 2019, Viettel declared that it would broadcast 5G network and deploy Internet of Things (IoT) infrastructure in Ho Chi Minh City. In Ho Chi Minh City, Viettel completed the construction of 1,000 NB-IoT stations with 100% coverage across the city and 5G coverage across Ward 12, District 10. Ho Chi Minh City became the first city in the country to have seamless 5G and IoT coverage. According to the Global System for Mobile Communications Association (GSMA), Viettel is the only Vietnamese enterprise to rank among the first 50 network operators to successfully deploy 5G technology in the world. This was done without support from Chinese firms such as Huawei and ZTE, the first company in the world to not endorse Chinese 5G technology, which got praises and controversies altogether.

On 16 September 2020, Viettel showed off a dummy model of an armed UAV on display in Hanoi.

Operations

Vietnam
Viettel had a market share (estimated based on revenues) of 40.67% in 2012. Its main competitors are Vinaphone (owned by VNPT) with 30% market share and MobiFone with 17.9%. They control almost 90% of the market, with the rest controlled by Vietnamobile with 8%, Gmobile (formerly Beeline) with 3.2% and S-Fone with 0.1%. Viettel reported having 58.9 million customers, while Vinaphone and MobiFone estimated having 70 million and Gmobile and Vietnamobile 10 million.

Viettel has developed telecommunication services in Laos, Cambodia, Haiti, Mozambique, Peru, Tanzania, Timor-Leste, Cameroon, Burundi and Myanmar.

International

Viettel Global Investment JSC (Viettel Global) handles all the countries foreign investments. Viettel has successfully developed telecommunication services in three continents, Asia, Africa and the Americas. It made a profit from its foreign operations for the first time in 2012, mainly based on profits from Cambodia and Laos and recorded a $1.2 billion revenue from foreign operations in 2014.

The company became the first Vietnamese company to provide as one of the official telecommunication services for the Peru national football team during the 2018 FIFA World Cup, the first Vietnamese company to achieve this feat.

Corporate affairs

Business scope
Viettel currently provides the following services and products:
 Products and services in telecommunications, IT, radio, television, and multimedia communications;
 Communication and telecommunications activities;
 E-commerce, post and delivery activities;
 Financial services, payment services, payment intermediaries, monetary intermediaries;
 Games, news websites and social network services;
 Consultancy in management, survey, and design of investment projects;
 Construction and operation of works, equipment, infrastructure of telecommunications, IT and television network;
 Research, development and trading in military equipment and supporting tools for defense and security purposes;
 Research, development and trading in dual-use equipment;
 Scientific research and development activities;
 Research, development and trading in machinery and equipment in telecommunications, IT, television and multimedia communications;
 Research, development and trading in products and services in military cryptography and cyber information security.
 Advertising and market research;
 Management consultancy in launching and trade promotion activities;
 Sports.

Revenue and profit

Headquarters
Viettel's headquarters is located at Lot D26, Lane 3, Ton That Thuyet Street, Yen Hoa Ward, Cau Giay District, Hanoi.

Controversies

Mytel
Following the 2021 Myanmar coup d'état and subsequent unrest, it was revealed that Viettel actively does business and assists the State Administration Council in cracking down protesters throughout Mytel, a joint-venture that owned by Viettel and the Tatmadaw, as for the result, its Burmese branch was sanctioned by the United States Treasury Department with assets frozen.

Viettel has also been embroiled, indirectly, for having business ties with the Lebanese diversified investment holdings company M1 Group (owned by the Mikati family's Taha and Najib), a supporter of authoritarian regimes in the Middle East, throughout Mytel. M1 Group has also bought Telenor's Myanmar after the Norwegian company exited due to instabilities.

References

External links

How to register for Viettel 4G service?

 
Companies based in Hanoi
Companies established in 2004
Mobile phone companies of Vietnam
Government-owned companies of Vietnam
Vietnamese brands
Defence companies of Vietnam